Hispanic and Latino Californians are residents of the state of California who are of Hispanic or Latino ancestry. As of the 2020 U.S. Census, Hispanics and Latinos of any race were 39.4% of the state's population, making it the largest ethnicity in California.

Californios (regional Spanish for "Californians") is a term to refer to the Californian Hispanic community, which has existed in California since 1683, and which is mainly of varying Spanish and Mexican national origin, and from racially broad groups such as Criollo Spaniards and Mestizos, with both European and Amerindian ancestry. Most would identify as Mexican Americans or as Chicanos.

History

The Hispanic presence in California has existed since the earliest European exploration of the region, the first such explorer of the California coast being Iberian explorer João Rodrigues Cabrilho (Juan Rodriguez Cabrillo). Cabrillo was commissioned by the Viceroy of New Spain (Mexico) and in 1542 he sailed into what is now San Diego, California. He continued north as far as Pt. Reyes, California.

California became part of the Spanish trading route, but was not well explored due to its remoteness from Europe and challenging terrain. In the 1700s, it was claimed by Spain which divided California into two parts, Baja California and Alta California, as provinces of New Spain (Mexico). Baja or lower California consisted of the Baja Peninsula and terminated roughly at San Diego, California where Alta California started. After the establishment of Missions in Alta California after 1769, the Spanish treated Baja California and Alta California as a single administrative unit, part of the Viceroyalty of New Spain, with Monterey, California, as its capital.

In 1821, Mexico gained its independence from Spain, and Alta California became one of the three interior provinces in the First Mexican Empire north of the Rio Grande, along with Texas and New Mexico. The Mexican government was unable to keep full control of its peripheral provinces, leading to the inundation of American immigrants inside its borders and the subsequent annexation of California by the United States in 1846. During Mexican rule, California was sparsely populated, with only a few thousand Mexican residents, compared to tens of thousands of Native Americans, and a handful of Yankee entrepreneurs. At the time of the annexation, "foreigners already outnumbered Californians of Spanish ancestry 9,000 to 7,500". The advent of the California Gold Rush in 1848 led to a massive influx of settlers – including thousands of Mexican miners, but also tens of thousands of Americans from the East. Other substantial immigrant groups included Chileans, Peruvians, and Chinese people. The Mexican Revolution also brought many refugees to California, including many Chinese Mexicans who fled Mexico’s anti-Chinese sentiment during the war and settled in the Imperial Valley.

In the early 1930s, the US began repatriating those of Mexican descent to Mexico, of which 1/5th of California Mexicans were repatriated by 1932.

During the first half of the 20th century, Mexican-American workers formed unions of their own and joined integrated unions. The most significant union struggle involving Mexican Americans was the effort to organize agricultural workers and the United Farm Workers' long strike and boycott aimed at grape growers in the San Joaquin and Coachella valleys in the late 1960s. Leaders César Chávez and Dolores Huerta gained national prominence as they led a workers' rights organization that helped workers get unemployment insurance to an effective union of farmworkers almost overnight. The struggle to protect rights and sustainable wages for migrant workers has continued.

Demographics

Spanish is the state's second most spoken language. Areas with especially large Spanish speaking populations include the Los Angeles metropolitan area, San Bernardino, Riverside,  the California-Mexico border counties of San Diego and Imperial (largest percentage in all of CA), and the San Joaquin Valley. Mexican American is the largest ethnicity in half the state's 58 counties.

By ethnicity, 38.1% of the total population is Hispanic (of any race). New Mexico and Texas have higher percentages of Hispanics, but California has the highest total number of Hispanics of any U.S. state. As of July 1, 2013, it is estimated that California's Hispanic population has equaled the population of non-Hispanic whites. Hispanics, mainly Mexican Americans, form major portions of the population of Southern California, especially in Los Angeles, as well as the San Joaquin Valley. The city of Los Angeles is often said to be the largest Mexican community in the United States. Census records kept track of the growth since 1850, but Hispanos and Mexican Americans have lived in California since the Spanish period. However, the number and percentage population of Hispanics living in California increased rapidly in the late 20th century. The result is that, today, Hispanics are the largest ethnic group in Los Angeles County, at over 40 percent of the county's population. Hispanics are predominantly concentrated in the older eastern and southern suburbs surrounding downtown Los Angeles and northern Long Beach, the southern/eastern San Fernando Valley, and the San Gabriel/Pomona Valleys. They also comprise sizable communities in Arvin, Bakersfield, Delano, El Monte, Fontana, Fresno, Indio, La Puente, Ontario, Oxnard, Riverside, Sacramento, San Bernardino, San Diego, San José, Santa Barbara, Santa Maria, Stockton, Vallejo, Watsonville and Yuba City. In Santa Ana in Orange County, Hispanics comprise 75 percent of the population. Nearby Anaheim is over half Hispanic, and Orange County's population is 30–35 percent Hispanic.

The Imperial Valley on the U.S.-Mexican border is about 82-87% Hispanic, including many decedents of Chinese Mexican refugees from the Mexican Revolution. Communities with many Hispanics can also be found in Riverside County, especially at its eastern end, and the Coachella Valley. The Central Valley has many Mexican American migrant farm workers. Hispanics are the majority (and sometimes, plurality) in 14 other counties: Colusa, Fresno, Glenn, Kern, Kings, Los Angeles (the county is 45% Latino), Madera, Merced, Monterey (esp. the Salinas area), San Benito, San Bernardino, Santa Cruz (estimated 30–40% due to migrant labor patterns), Tulare and Yolo counties.

Hispanics make up at least 20% of the San Francisco Bay Area. Many live in San Mateo, Alameda and Santa Clara counties, as well in San Francisco. The Napa Valley and Salinas Valley have predominantly Hispanic communities established by migrant farm workers. San Jose is about 30–35 percent Hispanic, the largest Hispanic community in northern California, while the Mission District, San Francisco and Lower/West Oakland has barrios established by Mexican and Hispanic American immigrants. The Mexican American communities of East Los Angeles and Logan Heights, San Diego, as well the San Joaquin Valley and Riverside county (almost half the population) are centers of historic Chicano and Hispanic cultures.

Most of the state's Hispanics have Mexican ancestry, but there are many Cuban Americans, Puerto Ricans, Guatemalan Americans, Honduran Americans, Salvadoran Americans, and Nicaraguan Americans, Chilean Americans, Colombian Americans and Peruvian Americans. Los Angeles has the United States' largest Central American community, as well as the largest Mexican American community since the 1910s and 1920s.

In Mariposa County, there is a very small community of Californios or Spanish American people as they identify themselves, that dates back before the U.S. annexation of California. Hornitos is home to an estimated 1,000 people and many are "Californio". The community's "Spanish" Californio culture is closely linked with Mexico and other Hispanic American nations.

Spanish language in California
As of 2010, 28.46% (9,696,638) of California residents age 5 and older spoke Spanish at home as a primary language. California has the second highest concentration of Spanish speakers in the United States.

California's first constitution recognized Spanish language rights:

By 1870, English-speaking Americans were a majority in California; in 1879, the state promulgated a new constitution under which all official proceedings were to be conducted exclusively in English, a clause that remained in effect until 1966. In 1986, California voters added a new constitutional clause, by referendum, stating that:

Spanish remains widely spoken throughout the state, and many government forms, documents, and services are bilingual, in English and Spanish. And although all official proceedings are to be conducted in English:

Historic Hispanic/Latino population

Colonial and Mexican era

California as part of the United States

See also

Californio
Chicano
History of Mexican Americans in Los Angeles
History of Central Americans in Los Angeles
Hispanic and Latino Americans in San Francisco
Salvadoran diaspora in Los Angeles
Demographics of California

Notes

References

Further reading
 Tomás F. Summers Sandoval, Jr., Latinos at the Golden Gate: Creating Community and Identity in San Francisco. Chapel Hill, NC: University of North Carolina Press, 2013.

External links

 Hispanics: California's Next Majority, The New York Times